Wheels Car of the Year (commonly abbreviated to COTY) is an annual automotive Car of the Year award presented by Wheels magazine. The publisher claims that it is the world's oldest continuous motoring award of its kind. The award is given to the best newly released vehicle each year.

History
Since 1963, Wheels has awarded the title of Car of the Year. In its inaugural year, the French Renault 8 became the inaugural COTY winner, which was built in many countries including Australia.

The original intention of COTY was to promote excellence in the Australian car manufacturing industry, dominated at the time by Ford, Holden, Chrysler, Datsun and Toyota. With the fuel crisis in the 1970s, European makers also based in Australia, such as Renault and Volkswagen, began closing their local assembly plants. With a shrinking local manufacturing base and reliability and quality issues that affected Australian-made cars, Wheels changed the basis of the award to include imported cars. At first, this was condemned by the local industry, unions and media, however, the approach permitted local products to be judged on a global basis. This, in turn, is claimed to have contributed towards a more competitive local industry and sees each winner heavily advertised as a COTY winner.

The award is given on an annual basis, except in 1972, 1979 and 1986 when, under the stewardship of the then-editor Peter Robinson, no newly released car in those years was considered worthy of the award.

The withholding of the award in 1972 and 1979 twice coincided with the release of a new Ford Falcon (the XA and XD series). On the second occasion, as the Falcon (XD) was a sales success and leading candidate for the 1980 COTY award, the then deputy manager of Ford Australia, Edsel Ford II, took out a 1-page advertisement in Wheels magazine, depicting the Falcon and other contenders as lemons and stating "There are times when being a lemon is not a bitter experience at all". This was both in answer to the award's withdrawal against the Falcon and Wheels' cover for March 1980, which was a four-wheeled lemon under the title "NO CAR OF THE YEAR".

The first imported car to win the award was the Japanese Honda Accord for 1977. In 1982, the award was shared for the first time between badge engineered cars and, in 1991, between completely different types of cars. Over the years, the COTY criteria has been further refined and, for 2004, it was amended to allow any Sport Utility Vehicle (SUV) to be eligible for the first time, permitting the Australian-made Ford Territory to take the title. For 2011, the Honda CR-Z instead became the first hybrid to win the award.

Starting from 2015, the temporal basis of how the award is branded has been changed such that, the award now carries the year of when the winner was announced, instead of the preceding year when testing took place. Consequently, what would have been the 2015 COTY winner is instead be the winner for 2016 and so forth.

COTY winners 
To date, in chronological order, the award winners (by name including series where available) have been the following:

Notes

Multiple wins

Most awarded vehicles

Multiple awards by manufacturer

 Includes award won by the S-Class predecessor—the Mercedes-Benz 380 SE (W126).

See also

 List of motor vehicle awards

References 

Motor vehicle awards